George Edward Hurrell  (June 1, 1904 – May 17, 1992) was a photographer who contributed to the image of glamour presented by Hollywood during the 1930s and 1940s.

Early life
Born in the Walnut Hills district of Cincinnati, Ohio, Hurrell originally studied as a painter with no particular interest in photography. He first began to use photography only as a medium for recording his paintings.  After moving to Laguna Beach, California from Chicago, Illinois in 1925 he met many other painters who had connections. One of those connections was Edward Steichen who encouraged him to pursue photography after seeing some of his works. Hurrell also found that photography was a more reliable source of income than painting. Hurrell was an apprentice to Eugene Hutchinson.  His photography was encouraged by his friend aviator Pancho Barnes, who often posed for him. He eventually opened a photographic studio in Los Angeles.

Career in Hollywood
In the late 1920s, Hurrell was introduced to the actor Ramon Novarro, by Pancho Barnes, and agreed to take a series of photographs of him. Novarro was impressed with the results and showed them to the actress Norma Shearer, who was attempting to mould her wholesome image into something more glamorous and sophisticated in an attempt to land the title role in the movie The Divorcee. She asked Hurrell to photograph her in poses more provocative than her fans had seen before.  After she showed these photographs to her husband, MGM production chief Irving Thalberg, Thalberg was so impressed that he signed Hurrell to a contract with MGM Studios, making him head of the portrait photography department. But in 1932, Hurrell left MGM after differences with their publicity head, and from then on until 1938 ran his own studio at 8706 Sunset Boulevard.
[[File:Jane Russell in The Outlaw.jpg|thumb|right|Jane Russell (pictured in 1943) by Hurrell publicity image for The Outlaw]]

Throughout the decade, Hurrell photographed every star contracted to MGM, and his striking black-and-white images were used extensively in the marketing of these stars.  Among the performers regularly photographed by him during these years were silent screen star Dorothy Jordan, as well as Myrna Loy, Robert Montgomery, Jean Harlow, Ramon Novarro, Joan Crawford, Clark Gable, Rosalind Russell, Marion Davies, Jeanette MacDonald, Lupe Vélez, Anna May Wong, Carole Lombard and Norma Shearer, who was said to have refused to allow herself to be photographed by anyone else.  He also photographed Greta Garbo at a session to produce promotional material for the movie Romance. The session didn't go well and she never used him again.

In the early 1940s Hurrell moved to Warner Brothers Studios photographing, among others Bette Davis, Jane Russell, Ann Sheridan, Errol Flynn, Olivia de Havilland, Ida Lupino, Alexis Smith, Lauren Bacall, Humphrey Bogart and James Cagney.  Later in the decade he moved to Columbia Pictures where his photographs were used to help the studio build the career of Rita Hayworth.

Postwar
He left Hollywood briefly to make training films for the First Motion Picture Unit of the United States Army Air Forces.  When he returned to Hollywood in the mid-1950s his old style of glamour had fallen from favour.  Where he had worked hard to create an idealised image of his subjects, the new style of Hollywood glamour was more earthy and gritty, and for the first time in his career Hurrell's style was not in demand. He moved to New York City and worked for the advertising industry where glamour was still valued.  He continued his work for fashion magazines and photographed for print advertisements for several years before returning to Hollywood in the 1960s.

After 1970, his most prominent work was as a photographer for album covers. He shot the cover photos for Cass Elliot's self-titled album (1972), Helen Reddy's Imagination (1983), Tom Waits' Foreign Affairs (1977), Fleetwood Mac's Mirage (1982), Queen's The Works (1984), Midge Ure's The Gift (1985) and Paul McCartney's Press to Play (1986).

Death
Hurrell died from complications from bladder cancer shortly after completing a TBS documentary about his life.  He died on May 17, 1992.

References

External links
Official Website for George Hurrell Photography, History, Blog and Licensing Information
George Hurrell Gallery
The Los Angeles County Museum of Art (LACMA) has 69 thumbnails of their collection.
Pancho Barnes and George Hurrell
George Hurrell Timeline
"Starlight and Shadow," The Atlantic, article on George Hurrell by Virginia Postrel Dead link

1904 births
1992 deaths
Artists from Cincinnati
20th-century American photographers
First Motion Picture Unit personnel
Deaths from bladder cancer
Deaths from cancer in California
Photographers from Ohio